The Electoral district of Mandurang was an electoral district of the Victorian Legislative Assembly (Australia), based in north central Victoria around, but not including, the town of Bendigo (then known as Sandhurst).

The district was defined as: 

The district of Mandurang was created in the expansion of the Legislative Assembly in 1859 and abolished in the redistribution of 1904.

Initially two members were returned, an additional member was added from 1877. After the 1889 electoral re-distribution where Sandhurst South and 40 other districts were created by the Electoral Act Amendment Act 1888, Mandurang reverted to one member.

Members

See also
 Parliaments of the Australian states and territories
 List of members of the Victorian Legislative Assembly

References
Parliament of Victoria

Former electoral districts of Victoria (Australia)
1859 establishments in Australia
1904 disestablishments in Australia